Ksenia Krimer (born ) is a  Russian female water polo player. She is part of the Russia women's national water polo team. She has competed in a number of international tournaments, including the 2016 Women's European Water Polo Championship.

References

1992 births
Living people
Russian female water polo players
Place of birth missing (living people)
21st-century Russian women